Rejuvenation is a studio album by American rapper Abstract Rude. It was released on Rhymesayers Entertainment on April 7, 2009. Production is handled by Vitamin D.

Critical reception

Andres Tardio of HipHopDX gave the album a 3.0 out of 5, commenting that "[Abstract Rude's] flow has always been a high point of his emceeing capabilities and this album highlights this." Rob Geary of XLR8R gave the album an 8 out of 10 and said, "Seattle's Vitamin D produces with an ear for scratchy funk guitars, low-ride tempos, and dusty drums that vibrate in tune with the grain of Abstract's signature voice."

Track listing

References

External links
 

2009 albums
Abstract Rude albums
Rhymesayers Entertainment albums